Kim Hwasang, also known in Chinese as Wuxiang (684–762), was a Korean master of Chan Buddhism who lived in Sichuan, China, whose form of Chan  teaching was independent of East Mountain Teaching and Huineng. His teachings were amongst the first streams of Chan Buddhism transmitted to Tibet.

Chan, the Tangut and Kim Hwasang
Solonin links the Tangut people, the Helan Mountains and Baotang Wuzhu:

Yün-Hua Jan (1986: pp. 27–28) states:

Buswell (2005: p. 191) states:

Transmission of Chan to the Nyingma school 

Chan Buddhism was introduced to the Nyingma school of Tibetan Buddhism in three principal streams: the teachings of Kim Hwashang transmitted by Sang Shi in c750 CE; the lineage of Baotang Wuzhu was transmitted within Tibet by Yeshe Wangpo; and the teaching of Moheyan, which were a synthesis of the East Mountain and Baotang schools.

Legend states that Trisong Detsen (742–797) invited Moheyan to teach at Samye. Moheyan had been teaching at Dunhuang, which the Tibetan Empire had conquered in 786, but he lost an important philosophical debate on the nature of emptiness from the Indian master Kamalaśīla and the king declared Kamalaśīla's philosophy should form the basis for Tibetan Buddhism rather than Chan. This legendary "great debate" was known as "the Council of Lhasa" and is narrated and depicted in a specific cham dance held annually at Kumbum Monastery, Qinghai.

Ray (2005) holds that the first documented dissemination of Chan to Tibet, chronicled in what has become known as the Statements of the Sba Family, occurred around 761 when Trisong Detsen sent a party to Yizhou to receive the teachings of Kim Hwashang, whom they encountered in Sichuan. The party received teachings and three Chinese texts from Kim, who died soon after.

Notes

Further reading 

 Yun-Hua, Jan (1989). A Comparative Study of 'No-thought' (Wu-nien) in Some Indian and Chinese Buddhist Texts. VVol. 16/1989: pp. 37–58. Dialogue Publishing Company. Source:  (accessed: January 25, 2008)

Korean Zen Buddhists
Korean emigrants to China